This is a list of the Permanent Representatives of the United Republic of Tanzania to the United Nations. The current office holder is Modest Jonathan Mero.

List

See also
Foreign relations of Tanzania

References

Tanzania

United Nations